Broomhouse railway station was opened in 1878 at Broomhouse in the Baillieston area of Glasgow, Scotland on the old Glasgow, Bothwell, Hamilton and Coatbridge Railway between Shettleston and Hamilton. The miner's rows at Boghall were close to the station site.

History

The station was opened by the North British Railway to serve the Broomhouse area in 1878 on the Glasgow, Bothwell, Hamilton and Coatbridge Railway route.

The route was also known as the London and North Eastern Railway's Hamilton Branch. It closed to passenger traffic on 4 October 1927 and to freight in 1953, having been previously closed to passengers between 1917 and 1919 as a wartime economy. The line was closed to freight traffic on 4 October 1964. Passenger trains continued to run to Bothwell until 4 July 1955.

Infrastructure
A signal box that controlled the colliery line lay at the south end of the station on the north side, replaced in 1914 and closed in 1960. Daldowie and Broomhouse collieries lay nearby to the north and south respectively, and crossovers on the double-track line in the area of the station allowed for the movement of waggons for these customers. There was a siding to a brickworks. The ticket office and waiting room were on the south platform, and a shelter on the north and a pedestrian footbridge were present.

The line to the west cut over the Caledonian Railway's Rutherglen and Coatbridge Railway line.

Remains on site
A road now runs across the old station site.

References

Notes

Sources

External links
 Railscot 

Disused railway stations in Glasgow
Railway stations in Great Britain opened in 1878
Railway stations in Great Britain closed in 1917
Railway stations in Great Britain opened in 1919
Railway stations in Great Britain closed in 1927
Former North British Railway stations